Rap Sh!t (pronounced "Rap Shit") is an American comedy streaming television series created by Issa Rae for HBO Max. The show is produced by Hoorae Productions and 3 Arts Entertainment and centers on two Miami-based rappers (portrayed by Aida Osman and KaMillion) who try to find success in the music industry. The series debuted at the American Black Film Festival on June 18, 2022 and was released on July 21, 2022. It was renewed for a second season in September 2022. Filming for season 2 began on February 17, 2023.

Plot 
The show follows Mia Knight and Shawna Clark, two estranged high school friends from Miami who come back together to form a rap group.

Cast and characters

Main 
Aida Osman as Shawna Clark, a struggling rapper who works at a hotel
 KaMillion as Mia Knight, a single mother and rapper working multiple jobs to support herself and her 4-year-old daughter, Melissa
 Jonica Booth as Chastity, a party promoter who goes by "The Duke of Miami" or simply "Duke." She also manages a group of sex workers.
 Devon Terrell as Cliff Lewis, Shawna's long-distance boyfriend who is a law student in New York
 RJ Cyler as Lamont, an aspiring producer with a sharp ear for talent and the father of Mia's daughter

Recurring 
Ashlei Sharpe Chestnut as Fatima, Cliff's law classmate and close friend
Daniel Augustin as Maurice, Shawna's friend and co-worker
Amandla Jahava as Jill, Shawna's college friend and employee at Spotify
Jaboukie Young-White as Francois Boom, Shawna's former schoolmate and producer
Brittney Jefferson as Alesia, Mia's friend from high school
DomiNque Perry as Nelly, a single mom and high school friend of Mia's

Guest 

 Guapdad 4000, Timbaland, Brent Faiyaz, Tobe Nwigwe, Benjamin Crump, and Maliibu Miitch appear as themselves.

Episodes

Production

Development
In October 2019 it was announced that Issa Rae would produce Rap Sh!t for HBO Max, a comedy series about a fledgling South Florida-based rap group, with a tentative premiere date of May 2020. In February 2021 it was announced that HBO Max ordered the eight-episode half hour series. 

Rap Sh!t is produced by Rae's company, Hoorae Media, and 3 Arts Entertainment. It is her first major project following the end of Insecure, which ran for five seasons. Similar to Insecure, each episode title of the season begins with the same phrase.

Rae is the show's head writer and executive producer with Montrel McKay and 3A's Dave Becky and Jonathan Barry. Syreeta Singleton, who wrote for Insecure, is also executive producer and serves as showrunner. Yung Miami and JT of rap duo City Girls are also co-executive producers with Kevin "Coach K" Lee and Pierre "P" Thomas (QC Films), and Sara Rastogi (Hoorae). The series is inspired by the story of the City Girls' founding and later success.

Production began in the summer of 2021. On May 5, 2021, it was reported that Sadé Clacken Joseph would direct the pilot. On August 23, 2021, it was reported that Devonté Hynes is set to serve as the series' composer.

In July 2022, the series received $12.6 million in tax credits from the California Film Commission for job creation. Rap Sh!t was renewed for a second season on September 12, 2022.

Casting
On May 5, 2021, it was announced that Aida Osman and KaMillion will star in the lead roles of Mia and Shawna, and Jonica Booth will also star. Osman, an executive story editor for the show, is best known as a co-host on the Crooked Media podcast Keep It. KaMillion is a rapper-singer who has appeared on Love & Hip Hop: Miami, and Booth is known for having appeared on Bad Girls Club.

On July 9, 2021, Devon Terrell joined the main cast. On August 6, 2021, Daniel Augustin, Ashlei Sharpe Chestnut, Amandla Jahava, and Jaboukie Young-White joined the cast in recurring roles. On August 16, 2021, RJ Cyler joined the main cast. Brittney Jefferson and DomiNque Perry were announced as recurring cast members on January 21, 2022.

Filming
Principal photography for the series began on August 8, 2021, and was scheduled to conclude on November 19, 2021, in Miami, Florida. Filming for season 2 began on February 17, 2023. 

In March, 2023, the production has come under fire for poor working conditions, 15+ hour working days, and a Camera Production Assistant was hurt when they fell off the lift gate and production continued filming that day. Production also refused to pay for hotels or Ubers for the crew.

Release 
The series debuted at American Black Film Festival on June 18, 2022. The series premiered on July 21, 2022 on HBO Max.

Critical reception
The review aggregator website Rotten Tomatoes reported a 100% approval rating with an average rating of 7.4/10, based on 18 critic reviews. The website's critics consensus reads, "Issa Rae's razor-sharp sensibility is fully felt in Rap Sh!t, a raucous chronicle of female camaraderie and youthful ambition." Metacritic, which uses a weighted average, assigned a score of 80 out of 100 based on 13 critics, indicating "generally favorable reviews".

Shanelle Genai praised Rap Sh!t in a review for The Root: "And while the show moves pretty fast and has a lofty amount of topics it’s trying to cover, all in all, the sophomore show from Issa Rae is already proving to be one of the most fun, must-see TV shows this summer." Similarly, Qunci Legardye of The A.V. Club rated the series a B+ and wrote in the review: "Though Rap Sh!t offers a lot of stimulating conversation starters about the state of the music industry, the rise of social media, and Rae’s choices in building her legacy, it’s primarily a funny-ass show about women trying to change their lives." The Ringer's Alison Herman praised the use of cinematographic framing to depict various scenes that take place on digital platforms: "Pilot director Sadé Clacken Joseph, who’s helmed music videos and commercials for Common and T.I., sets the tone, toggling freely between Snapchats, Instagram Lives, phone footage, and cam sessions...Rap Sh!t’s use of online platforms isn’t just innovative. It’s key to the story it wants to tell about a world where clout and musical cred are increasingly interrelated. Shelli Nicole praised the friendship at the core of the series in a review for RogerEbert.com: "“Rap Sh!t” not only centers friendship but it’s a new one, one that is being rediscovered. Yes, there is judgment and bickering between the two, but there is also sweetness and care. It feels real as they discover each other’s flaws, uncover their needs, and learn about themselves through the eyes of another person."

Awards and nominations

References

External links 
 
 

2022 American television series debuts
African-American television
2020s American comedy television series
2020s American black television series
English-language television shows
HBO Max original programming
Hip hop television
Works about the music industry
Television series by 3 Arts Entertainment
Television shows set in Miami
Hoorae Media